The Strangers is a 2008 American psychological horror film written and directed by Bryan Bertino in his directorial debut and is the first installment of The Strangers film series. The plot follows Kristen (Liv Tyler) and James (Scott Speedman) whose stay at a vacation home is disrupted by three masked criminals who infiltrate the home. The screenplay was inspired by two real-life events: the multiple-homicide Manson family Tate murders and a series of break-ins that occurred in Bertino's neighborhood as a child. Some journalists noted similarities between the film and the Keddie cabin murders that occurred in Keddie, California, in 1981, though Bertino did not cite this as a reference.

Made on a budget of $9 million, the film was shot on location in rural South Carolina in the fall of 2006. Originally slated for a theatrical release in November 2007, it was postponed before a theatrical release on May 30, 2008. The film became a sleeper hit, grossing $82 million at the box office worldwide. It received mixed reviews from critics, with some praising its atmosphere and tension, and others criticizing its script and characters.

In the years since its release, it has become a cult film. It successfully launched a film series, including a sequel titled The Strangers: Prey at Night which was released on March 9, 2018. An upcoming third film is also currently in production and will be subsequently followed by two more films.

Plot
James Hoyt and Kristen McKay arrive at night to James' isolated childhood summer home after attending a friend's wedding. Tension abounds between the couple, as Kristen rejected James' marriage proposal to her after the reception. James calls his friend Mike and asks him to pick him up in the morning. Shortly after 4:00 a.m., there is a loud knock at the door. A young blonde woman, whose face is obstructed by poor lighting, asks the couple "Is Tamara here?" James tells her she is at the wrong house, and the woman leaves. James goes for a drive to purchase a pack of cigarettes for Kristen; before he departs, he starts a fire in the hearth. While waiting for him to return, Kristen hears another knock on the door but doesn't open it. Upon asking who it is, she learns it is the same woman from earlier, asking for Tamara; Kristen reminds her that she already came by and locks the door as she walks away. Kristen realizes the chimney flue is closed and attempts to open it; smoke emanating from the fire triggers a smoke alarm. Kristen attempts to disarm the alarm when she is startled by another knock at the door and drops the alarm on the floor, unnerved. She calls James' cellphone from the landline, but their call is cut short. Kristen returns to the kitchen, where, unbeknownst to her, a masked man watches her from an adjacent hallway.

Kristen notices the smoke alarm she left on the floor is now sitting on a chair and realizes someone has been in the house. Upon going to retrieve her cell phone from the charger, she finds it is missing and begins to panic. When she hears a noise from the backyard, she arms herself with a knife and opens the curtains to find the masked man staring at her. Horrified, she stumbles into the hallway and watches as the front door is forced ajar. When she tries to close the door closed, the blonde woman, now in a doll-like mask, peers inside. After locking the door, Kristen retreats to the bedroom, where she hears a loud crash, before James returns. After she explains what has happened, he goes outside to the car to obtain his phone, whereupon he finds the car ransacked and vandalized, and sees the masked blonde woman watching him from afar. The couple attempt to leave in James' car but another masked brunette woman rear-ends them in a pickup truck, forcing them to flee back to the house.

Kristen and James find a shotgun and wait for the intruders in a bedroom. Mike arrives and realizes something is wrong after seeing James' vandalized car. He enters the house, and James, mistaking him for one of the intruders, shoots him dead. Devastated, James remembers an old radio transmitter in a barn on the property. He leaves and encounters the brunette woman, searching the backyard with a flashlight. When James tries to shoot her, the masked man ambushes him and knocks him unconscious, inadvertently discharging the rifle. Kristen hears the shot and runs to the barn. She finds the radio, but the brunette woman smashes it with an axe. Kristen rushes back to the house and encounters the blonde woman, who taunts her with a knife. She tries to escape but is knocked unconscious by the masked man. At dawn, the couple awaken to find themselves tied to chairs in the living room with the intruders standing before them. Kristen attempts to plead with the strangers, before demanding an explanation, to which the blonde woman replies, "Because you were home."

The offenders unmask themselves to Kristen and James before taking turns stabbing them in the chest and abdomen. Afterwards, they drive away in their truck and come across two young boys on bicycles distributing religious tracts. The blonde woman steps out of the truck and asks if she can have one of their tract cards. One of the boys asks her, "Are you a sinner?" to which she responds, "Sometimes." The boy gives her one, and the strangers drive away as the brunette woman states, "It'll be easier next time." The two boys come upon the house, where they discover the bloodied bodies of Kristen, James, and Mike inside. One of the boys approaches Kristen's body and attempts to touch it. As he reaches out to her, Kristen, still alive, startles him by grabbing his hand and screaming.

Cast
 Liv Tyler as Kristen McKey
 Scott Speedman as James Hoyt
 Gemma Ward as Dollface
 Kip Weeks as Man in Mask
 Laura Margolis as Pin-Up Girl
 Glenn Howerton as Mike

Themes
Film scholar Kevin Wetmore noted the film's portrayal of violence as a reflection of its contemporary culture, writing: "Death is a random act in post-9/11 horror—the result of being in the wrong place at the wrong time, as the cliché goes. Unlike in eighties slasher horror, for example, where engaging in negative behavior such as drinking, doing drugs, having premarital sex are often forerunners to being killed by the killer(s); [here], death is random and unrelated to one's behavior."

In The Horror Show Guide: The Ultimate Frightfest of Movies, Mike Mayo noted the film's "grim realism," writing that the main characters "could have wandered out of a gloomy Ingmar Bergman film," ultimately branding the film as an example of "naturalistic domestic horror" akin to Michael Haneke's Funny Games.

The film has also been noted by scholar Philip Simpson as highlighting "the divide between the underprivileged and privileged classes," as well as for its inversion of commonly-held beliefs about violence in urban areas and pastoral ethics: "The Strangers, as many horror films do ... undermines the conventional notion of rural society as a simpler, crime-free place. One might call the narrative sensibility informing The Strangers 'pastoral paranoia', in that danger lurks among the rough folk of the country rather than the suburbs and cities. Of course, it may be that provincial violence is a result of contamination, or in other words that the kind of stranger-upon-stranger violence typically associated with urban life metastasizes to the rural, a phenomenon noted by Louis Wirth."

In his book Hearths of Darkness: The Family in the American Horror Film (2014), scholar Tony Williams notes the film's setting within a 1970s-era home as representative of an "American tradition of violence that is random and without any coherent explanation." Additionally, Williams reads the three masked assailants as metaphors for the "repressed and unresolved tensions affecting the couple inside the house."

Production

Screenplay and inspiration
 Writer-director Bryan Bertino wrote the screenplay which was originally titled The Faces; it was the third screenplay he had ever written. Bertino had a particular interest in the horror genre, noting how one can connect to an audience by scaring them, and would state in subsequent interviews that he grew up watching horror films. In particular, he stated he was significantly inspired by thriller films of the 1970s while writing the screenplay, and envisioned a film that "put the audience in the world of the victims."

According to production notes and subsequent interviews, the film was inspired by true events from Bertino's childhood: Bertino explains:

In interviews, Bertino stated he was "very impressed" with some of the theories circulating on the Internet about the "true events" the movie is allegedly based on, but said that his main inspiration was the true crime book Helter Skelter, which is about the Manson Family murders; some journalists speculated that the film was also inspired by the unsolved Keddie Cabin Murders of 1981 that occurred in a small vacation community in California's Sierra Nevada. The film's premise has been compared by some film critics to the French horror film Them, released two years earlier, which also features a couple terrorized by strangers in their remote home.

Bertino entered the screenplay for The Strangers into a screenwriting contest, after which he sold its directorial rights to Universal Pictures.

Casting

When casting the two leading actors in the film, Bertino sought Liv Tyler for the role of Kristen. Tyler, who had not worked for several years after the birth of her son, accepted the part after being impressed by the script, which she read while on a flight from Japan to Los Angeles: "I especially liked Bryan's way of saying a lot, but not saying everything. Often in movies, it's all spelled out for you, and the dialogue is very explanatory. But Bryan doesn't write like that; he writes how normal people communicate—with questions lingering. I knew it would be interesting to act that." Thandie Newton and Charlize Theron also expressed interest in the role. Canadian actor Scott Speedman was cast as James. Speedman was also impressed by the script, stating that "the audience actually gets time to breathe with the characters before things get scary as hell. That got me interested from the first pages".

In casting the three masked intruders, Bertino chose Australian fashion model Gemma Ward for the part of Dollface, feeling she had the exact "look" he had imagined; Ward was officially cast in the film in September 2006. In preparing for the role, Ward read Vincent Bugliosi's Helter Skelter for inspiration. Kip Weeks was then chosen as the Man in the Mask, and television actress Laura Margolis, who found the script to be a real "page turner", was cast in the part of Pin-Up Girl. In retrospect, Bertino said he chose the three actors based on their abilities to convey their characters in spite of the fact that their faces remain unseen onscreen.

Filming

Bertino had not initially planned on directing The Strangers, and had been disconnected from the project after selling directorial rights to Universal Pictures. Both Justin Lin and Mark Romanek were attached to direct, but eventually backed out. Approximately two years after Bertino had sold the screenplay, Universal passed the project on to its subsidiary, Rogue Pictures, who approached Bertino to direct the project, despite his lack of experience.

On a $9 million budget, filming for The Strangers began on October 10, 2006, and finished in early 2007. It was shot on location roughly 10 miles outside of Florence, South Carolina, and the  house interior was constructed by a set crew. Though the film takes place in 2005, the house itself was deliberately constructed with an architecture reminiscent of 1970s ranch houses and dressed in furnishings applicable to the era. Bertino based the house on the types of homes common where he had grown up in rural Texas. The property was located on the outskirts of Timmonsville, South Carolina. Despite weather complications, the film was largely shot in chronological order.

During production, it was reported that Liv Tyler came down with tonsillitis due to the extensive screaming the role required her to do. Tyler would later recall it being the most difficult film she had ever worked on, "both physically and emotionally." According to Laura Margolis, who played the Pin-Up Girl, Tyler also specifically requested that she not see her mask prior to filming: "I got strict instructions not to let Liv see me in my mask before we shot," Margolis recalled. "The first scene that I shot was stalking [her] outside of the barn. I had been told that she really wanted to be scared. She didn't want to have to fake it, and so it was my responsibility to really scare her. So we shot that scene, I ran at her, she started actually screaming, and then she kicked me away."

The masks featured in the film were chosen by Bertino, who wanted them to appear as though the killers "could have picked them up at any store."

Post-production
Film editor Kevin Greutert was hired to edit the film; at the time, he had recently finished editing Saw III. Several changes were made to the film during post-production, primarily regarding the conclusion: In the screenplay and the original footage shot, the three masked strangers reveal their faces on camera. After the sequence in which Kristen and James are stabbed, the strangers wander around the house, cleaning up parts of the crime scene before dressing into Kristen and James's clothes. Following test screenings, it was decided by the producers that the strangers' faces should remain unseen to the audience, which required the sequences following the stabbing to be excised.

Music

A musical score, consisting of 19 pieces composed by score producer tomandandy, was released on May 27, 2008, and was distributed by Lakeshore Records. The album was received with generally positive reviews by critics. "It's a creepy score for what appears to be a movie that will make you jump as well as make sure that the doors are locked at night," writes reviewer Jeff Swindoll. "This is an impressive score and adds a tremendous chill-factor to the film," says Zach Freeman of Blogger News, grading it with an A.

Track listing

Songs from Film, but not on Soundtrack
 "Ariel Ramirez" - Richard Buckner 
 "Hopeful" - Jennifer O'Connor
 "At My Window Sad and Lonely" - Billy Bragg and Wilco 
 "Sprout and the Bean" - Joanna Newsom
 "My First Lover" - Gillian Welch
 "Mama Tried" - Merle Haggard

Release

Marketing and promotion

In late July 2007, Bertino, Tyler and Speedman attended San Diego's annual Comic-Con event to promote the film; all three were present for a questions-and-answers panel session, as well as a screening of the film's official teaser trailer; this trailer was released on the internet several weeks later. It was not until March 2008 that a full-length trailer for the film was released, which can be found on Apple's QuickTime trailer gallery. The trailer originally began running in theaters attached to Rogue Pictures' sci-fi film Doomsday in March 2008, and television advertisements began airing on networks in early-mid April 2008 to promote the film's May release.

Two one-sheet posters for the film were released in August 2007, one showing the three masked Strangers, and the other displaying a wounded Liv Tyler. In April 2008, roughly two months before the film's official theatrical debut, the final, official one-sheet for the film was released, featuring Liv Tyler standing in a darkened kitchen with a masked man looming behind her in the shadows.

Box office
The producers originally planned for a summer release in July 2007, which was eventually postponed to November 2007; however, this date was postponed as well. The producers instead opted for a summer release, and The Strangers had its theatrical debut in United States and Canada on May 30, 2008. In its opening weekend, the film grossed $21 million in 2,467 theaters, ranking #3 at the box office and averaging $8,514 per theater. The film became a sleeper hit with a successful box-office return, earning $82.4 million worldwide.

Home media
The Strangers was released on DVD and Blu-ray in the United States on October 21, 2008. Both the Blu-ray and DVD feature rated and unrated versions of the film, with the unrated edition running approximately two minutes longer. Bonus materials include two deleted scenes and a making-of featurette. The DVD was released in the UK on December 26, 2008. The film was available on Universal VOD (Video on Demand) from November 19, 2008, through March 31, 2009. In commemoration of the film's 10th anniversary, a two-disc collector's edition Blu-ray by Scream Factory was released on March 6, 2018, featuring a 2K video transfer, as well as a combination of new and archival cast and crew interviews.

Reception
On Rotten Tomatoes, the film holds an approval rating of 48% based on 165 reviews, with an average rating of 5.1/10. The website's critical consensus reads: "The Strangers has a handful of genuinely scary moments, but they're not enough to elevate the end results above standard slasher fare." Metacritic reported a weighted average score of 47 out of 100, based on 27 critics, indicating "mixed or average reviews". Audiences polled by CinemaScore gave the film an average grade of "B−" on an A+ to F scale.

Unfavorable reviews included Roger Ebert's of the Chicago Sun-Times, who gave the film one-and-a-half stars out of four, saying: "The movie deserves more stars for its bottom-line craft, but all the craft in the world can't redeem its story." Bob Mondello of NPR said the film was "A sadistic, unmotivated home-invasion flick." Steven Rea of The Philadelphia Inquirer noted that "No one is getting at anything in The Strangers, except the cheapest, ugliest kind of sadistic titillation." Elizabeth Weitzman of the New York Daily News compared the film to 2007's Vacancy – a "comparison which does 'Strangers' no favors. 'Vacancy' director Nimród Antal gave us a pair of heroes who fought like hell to survive, becoming closer and stronger in the effort. Bertino's undeveloped protagonists are colossally stupid and frustratingly passive." Stephen Hunter of The Washington Post panned the film, calling it "a fraud from start to finish." Mick LaSalle of the San Francisco Chronicle, said the film "uses cinema to ends that are objectionable and vile," but admitted that "it does it well, with more than usual skill." Wesley Morris of The Boston Globe said of the director, "Bertino has the pretensions of an artist and the indelicacy of a hack. He tries to get under our skin with a pile driver." Stephen Whitty of The Star-Ledger opined of the film, "Unfolding with an almost startling lack of self-awareness, young filmmaker Bryan Bertino's debut is such a careful, straight-faced knockoff of '70s exploitation films that it plays like a parody."

Among the positive reviews, Jeannette Catsoulis of The New York Times said The Strangers is "suspenseful," "highly effective," and "smartly maintain[s] its commitment to tingling creepiness over bludgeoning horror." Michael Rechtshaffen of The Hollywood Reporter called the film a "creepily atmospheric psychological thriller with a death grip on the psychological aspect." James Berardinelli of ReelViews gave the film 3 out of 4 stars, saying that, "This is one of those rare horror movies that concentrates on suspense and terror rather than on gore and a high body count." Scott Tobias of The A.V. Club said that "as an exercise in controlled mayhem, horror movies don't get much scarier."

Additional positive feedback for the film came from Joblo.com reviewer Berge Garabedian, who praised director Bertino for "building the tension nicely, with lots of silences, creepy voices, jump scares, use of songs and a sharp eye behind the camera, as well as plenty of Steadicam give it all more of a voyeuristic feel." Empire Magazine remarked on the film's retro-style, saying, "Like much recent horror, from the homages of the Grindhouse gang through flat multiplex remakes of drive-in classics, The Strangers looks to the '70s.", and ultimately branded the film as "an effective, scary emotional work-out." Slant Magazines Nick Schager listed The Strangers as the 9th best film of 2008.

In 2009, the film was ranked #13 on "Bravo's 13 Scarier Movie Moments" television piece, and in a 2018 retrospective, Clark Collis of Entertainment Weekly deemed the film a "modern-day slasher classic." The A.V. Club named it the 23rd best horror film made since 2000.

Sequels

In August 2008, Rogue Pictures confirmed that a sequel was in the works, with Brian Bertino co-writing the screenplay with Ben Ketai. The project was originally slated to enter principal photography in 2009, during which time it was tentatively titled The Strangers: Part II. Directors Laurent Briet and Marcel Langenegger were considered to direct, but landed eventually to Johannes Roberts. After a troubled development period, filming on the sequel began May 30, 2017. Later titled The Strangers: Prey at Night, the film was released on March 9, 2018.

See also
 List of films featuring home invasions
 Keddie cabin murders
 No Through Road

References

Sources

External links
 
 
 
 
 
 

The Strangers (film series)
2008 films
2008 directorial debut films
2008 horror films
2008 independent films
2008 psychological thriller films
2000s horror thriller films
2000s psychological horror films
2000s serial killer films
American horror thriller films
American psychological horror films
American psychological thriller films
American serial killer films
Films about couples
Films about stalking
Films about vacationing
Films produced by Roy Lee
Films scored by Tomandandy
Films set in 2005
Films set in country houses
Films shot in South Carolina
Focus Features films
Home invasions in film
Intrepid Pictures films
Mandate Pictures films
Rogue (company) films
Vertigo Entertainment films
2000s English-language films
2000s American films
Universal Pictures films